Once Upon a Time is the sixth studio album by American singer-songwriter Donna Summer. It was released on October 31, 1977, and peaked at No. 26 on the US Billboard 200, number thirteen on the Top R&B/Hip-Hop Albums chart and  No. 24 on the UK Albums Chart. The entire album charted as one entry at  No. 1 on the Hot Dance/Disco chart. Once Upon a Time includes the singles "I Love You", "Fairy Tale High", "Once Upon a Time" and "Rumour Has It". The album did not spawn a hit single as popular as "I Feel Love".

The concept album was Summer's (and Disco's) first double album, telling a modern-day Cinderella-themed story through means of disco music. The album's story concept was conceived by Joyce Bogart, Susan Munao and Donna Summer based on an idea by Al Bogatz. The songs were written in collaboration between Summer, Giorgio Moroder and Pete Bellotte. The album was her last to be recorded at Musicland Studios in Munich. Arrangements were handled by Bob Esty while electronic arrangements were the work of Moroder. The artwork was designed by Stephen Lumel and Gribbitt! with photography by Francesco Scavullo.

Concept and image
Summer's previous two records were musical concept albums: 1976's Four Seasons of Love told the story of a love affair by relating it to the four seasons, while 1977's I Remember Yesterday presented a musical catalogue of musical styles and lyrical themes from the past, present and an imagined future. Once Upon a Time is another concept album—the first "disco opera" per Robert Christgau—developed by Joyce Bogart, Susan Munao and Donna Summer as a modern-day Cinderella narrative.

Throughout the album and as described in the liner notes storyline, the songs tell the story of a young woman who lives in a fantasy world of make-believe in which she is seemingly trapped, but thanks to her belief in her dreams she embarks on an adventure that ends with the man she loves entering her life.  The "rags to riches" story is brought into the modern day via the use of the electronic disco sound.

Release and reception

The album sold reasonably well as it made the US Top 30 and was certified gold in the U.S. by the RIAA that same year. It spawned the European hit single "I Love You", which became her fifth Top 10 in the UK in less than two years, and it also hit the US Top 40. "Rumour Has It" was also a UK Top 20 hit.

Track listing

Charts

Weekly charts

Year-end charts

Certifications

Cover versions, appearances in other media etc.
"Sweet Romance" has been sampled by Ilacoin for his underground hit "By a Stranger", which had guest appearances from Labba and Black Rob and featured on Grand Theft Auto III. In 2001, Awaken covered "(Theme) Once Upon a Time" in their album Party in Lyceum's Toilets.

The song "I Love You" was also featured prominently in the Saturday Night Live skits featuring Tom Hanks "Sabra Shopping Network" and "Sabra Price is Right".

References

1977 albums
Donna Summer albums
Albums produced by Giorgio Moroder
Albums produced by Pete Bellotte
Casablanca Records albums
Concept albums